Marc Trujillo (born 1966) is an American painter.

Artistic Style
His paintings depict places common to North American urban and suburban landscapes such as big chain and warehouse stores, gas stations, shopping malls, and chain restaurants.

Trujillo’s paintings are fundamentally synthetic in nature, and represent not only the experience of direct observation, but also an appreciation and awareness of paintings and painters of the past. Each finished painting is the sum of a series of steps that begin with drawing and preparatory sketches. Before beginning the final oil painting, Trujillo completes a grisaille, a monochromatic underpainting that allows him to establish the initial composition of each work.

Personal
Trujillo was born in Albuquerque, New Mexico and currently resides in Los Angeles where he teaches at Santa Monica College. He received his BA in 1991 from the University of Texas at Austin and his MFA in 1994 from the Yale University School of Art where he received the Ely Harwood Schless Memorial Fund Prize as well as the Ellen Battell Stoeckel Trust Fellowship.

Awards
In 2001, Trujillo received the Louis Comfort Tiffany Foundation Award and in 2008, he received the Rosenthal Family Foundation Award in Art from the American Academy of Arts and Letters as well as the John Simon Guggenheim Fellowship.

References

External links 
 MarcTrujillo.com
 Guggenheim Foundation
 Artfacts.net
 Marc Trujillo, ArtWorks Magazine
 Marc Trujillo, LA Weekly
 Marc Trujillo at Santa Monica College
 Sonce Alexander Gallery

Yale School of Art alumni
University of Texas at Austin alumni
Living people
1966 births
American male painters